Progressive Aerodyne, Inc is an American aircraft manufacturer based in Tavares, Florida. The company specializes in the design and manufacture of amphibious kit aircraft for the amateur-construction market.

History
The company was founded in 1991 in Orlando, Florida by Kerry Richter, Wayne Richter and Paige Lynette. The company moved to Tavares, Florida in May 2010. In 2011 Adam Yang became CEO. In 2022 Geoffrey Nicholson was CEO..

The company's main product, the SeaRey, was first flown in November 1992.

Aircraft

References

External links

Aircraft manufacturers of the United States
Homebuilt aircraft